Saint-Nazaire is a municipality in Quebec, Canada.

Demographics
Population trend:
 Population in 2011: 2114 (2006 to 2011 population change: 13.3%)
 Population in 2006: 1866
 Population in 2001: 2028
 Population in 1996: 2095
 Population in 1991: 2024

Private dwellings occupied by usual residents: 802 (total dwellings: 837)

Mother tongue:
 English as first language: 0%
 French as first language: 98.9%
 English and French as first language: 0%
 Other as first language: 1.1%

See also
 List of municipalities in Quebec

References

External links

Municipalities in Quebec
Incorporated places in Saguenay–Lac-Saint-Jean